Garrard Sliger "Buster" Ramsey (March 16, 1920 – September 16, 2007) was an American football player for the College of William and Mary and Chicago Cardinals. He was the first head coach of the AFL's Buffalo Bills.

Playing career
After a stint in the United States Navy during World War II, Ramsey played for the Chicago Cardinals of the National Football League (NFL) from 1946 to 1951. During his time with the Cardinals, Ramsey was a member of the franchise’s 1947 NFL World Championship team.

Coaching career
In 1951, Ramsey served as a player-coach for the Cardinals before becoming the Detroit Lions’ defensive coordinator in 1952. During his tenure with the Lions, Ramsey developed the 4-3 defense, a staple of modern football. In addition, he was the first coach to blitz linebackers, in a package he called Red Dog. With Ramsey as defensive coordinator the Lions won three World Championships in the 1950s. He developed a number of Lions greats including Yale Lary, Jack Christiansen, and Jim David, among others. In 1960, he was hired as the first head coach of the American Football League’s Buffalo Bills. Though fired by Bills' owner Ralph C. Wilson Jr. after the 1961 AFL season, Ramsey is credited with laying the foundation of what would become one of the best defenses in AFL history. He would go on to serve as the defensive coordinator of the Pittsburgh Steelers from 1962 to 1964.

Personal life
Ramsey had a brother, Knox Ramsey, who also played for the College of William and Mary, and later professionally for the Chicago Cardinals and Washington Redskins. Ramsey was elected into the Virginia Sports Hall of Fame in 1974, and the College Football Hall of Fame in 1978.

Head coaching record

See also

 List of American Football League players

References

External links
 
 
 First Bills coach Garrard "Buster" Ramsey dies USA Today September 18, 2007
 Garrard Ramsey Obituary - Signal Mountain, Tennessee | Legacy.com

1920 births
2007 deaths
American football guards
Bainbridge Commodores football players
Buffalo Bills coaches
Chicago Cardinals coaches
Chicago Cardinals players
Detroit Lions coaches
Pittsburgh Steelers coaches
William & Mary Tribe football players
College Football Hall of Fame inductees
United States Navy personnel of World War II
People from Blount County, Tennessee
Sportspeople from Knoxville, Tennessee
Players of American football from Knoxville, Tennessee
People from Signal Mountain, Tennessee
Buffalo Bills head coaches